Alfred Allen Marcus (born 1950) is an American author and the Edson Spencer Professor of Strategy and Technology Leadership at the Carlson School of Management, University of Minnesota and the Technological Leadership Institute. He has worked as a consultant with companies such as 3M, Corning Inc., Xcel Energy, Medtronic, General Mills, and IBM and has also taught as a visiting professor at Technion, INCAE, BI Norwegian Business School, Fordham University, and MIT.

Environmental and energy policy career
Marcus was born in Pittsburgh, Pennsylvania and grew up in the Squirrel Hill neighborhood. He attended the University of Chicago for his bachelor's and master's degrees, before finishing his PhD in political science at Harvard University under James Q. Wilson. Outside academy, he has worked on environmental and energy policy analysis during the Carter and Reagan years at the Battelle Human Affairs Research Centers in Seattle, Washington. There he conducted and participated in studies on the commercialization of alternative energy technologies and new energy saving technologies.

Following the Three Mile Island nuclear power incident, he also became involved in the work carried out by the Nuclear Regulatory Commission on the organization and management of nuclear power plants. Marcus has written many academic articles relating to organizational safety in publications like the Academy of Management Journal, the Strategic Management Journal, and Organization Science.

Published works
His work focuses primarily on  the relationship between public policy, the environment, and American business and his books include: 
Promise and Performance: Choosing and Implementing an Environmental Policy (1980) - Praeger. 
The Adversary Economy (1984) - Praeger. 
Managing Environmental Issues: A Casebook (1992) - Prentice Hall. 
Controversial Issues in Energy Policy (1992) - SAGE Publications. 
Reinventing Environmental Regulation: Lessons from Project XL (2002) -Routledge. 
Strategic Foresight - A New Look at Scenarios (2010). - Palgrave Macmillan. 
Innovations in Sustainability (2015) - Cambridge University Press.

Selected bibliography

See also
Paul Shrivastava

References

External links
 Alfred Marcus at Google Scholar
Dr. Marcus at ResearchGate
 

University of Minnesota faculty
Living people
American business theorists
Harvard University alumni
University of Chicago alumni
1950 births